Vifärna is a village in Ekerö Municipality, Stockholm County, southeastern Sweden.

References

Populated places in Ekerö Municipality
Uppland